Temples of the Indian State of Karnataka illustrate the variety of architecture prevalent in various periods. The architectural designs have found a distinguished place in forming a true atmosphere of devotion for spiritual attainment.

Most famous temples of Karnataka 

 Shri Agnidurga Gopalakrishna Maha kala Bhairava Temple, Karamogaru, Mangaluru
 Shri Kadri Manjunatha Temple, Mangaluru
 Shri Ranganathaswamy Temple, Srirangapatna 
 Shri Chamundeswari Temple, Mysore
Navagraha Jain Temple, Hubli
 Shri Mangaladevi Temple, Mangaluru
 Sri Kollur Mookambika Temple, Kollur
 Shri Subramanya Temple, Kukke Subramanya
Shri Kshethra Dharmasthala Manjunatha Swamy Temple, Dharmasthala, Dakshina Kannada
 Shri Rajarajeswari Temple, Polali
 Shri Durga Parameshwari Temple, Kateelu
 Gokarnanatheshwara Temple Kudroli, Mangaluru
Sri Mahalakshmi Lakkamma devi Temple, Keresanthe. Kadur Tq, Chikkamagaluru (dist ).
 International Society for Krishna Consciousness (ISKCON) Temple, Bangalore
Sri Hasanamba Temple, Hassan
Sri Chennakesava Temple, Belur, Hassan
Sri Mahantheshwara Mata Karegudda Sri Hoysaleswara Temple, Halebidu, Hassan
 Padutirupathi Venkataramana Temple, Karkala
 Kudalasangama
 Sringeri Sharada Peetham, Sringeri
 Sri Gude mahalineshrawara Temple, Herenjalu Kundapura tq, Udupi dist
 Santhoor Subramanya Temple 
 Mandyada Shri Shiradi Sai Baba Mandir, Mandya, Mandya District, Karnataka
 Sri Lakshmi Venkateshwara Temple, Gadag, Gadag District, Karnataka
Narasimha swamy Temple, Seebi, Tumkur
Shri Kalaseshwara temple, kalasa, Chikkamagaluru district
SriKshetra horanadu, chikkamagalur district
Mahatobara Idagunji Mahaganapathy Devastana, Honnavara, Uttara Kannada
Puttur Shree Mahalingeshwara Temple, Puttur, Dakshina Kannada

Architecture

Temples of Karnataka feature many architectural styles:
 Hoysala Architecture
 Badami Chalukya Architecture
 Vijayanagara architecture
 Dravidian Architecture
 Western Chalukya Architecture
 Badami Cave Temples
 Rashtrakuta style
 Ganga Architecture

Most temples have some features in common:
 Nandi (bull) sculpted in black stone at the entrance of a temple is symbolic of the start of the divine place and temple area.
 Pushkarani (a stepped bathing area), with neatly sculpted steps, for temple devotees travelling from far places to take a breather and cleanse. The pushkarani is typically a square-shaped construction which has arrangements to keep the water flowing so it does not stagnate.
 Gopura are ornate monumental towers which mark the entrance to the temple.
 Garbhagudi (garbha meaning womb in Sanskrit/Kannada) is the inner sanctum, which can be of various sizes and shapes according to the architecture. Garbhagudi may be placed on an elevated position on a stone foundation. Artists may find a place to practice and display devotional sangeetha (music) and naatya (dancing).
 Vigraha is an image of the God, typically a black stone lingam, inside the inner sanctum (garbhagudi).

Normally the oldest temples are built on hilltops, where people view God being placed on top of all in the midst of Prakṛti (nature). The steps to reach the top are carefully carved on rocky hills as most of the hard stone mountains rocks contain water. Shiva Gange at Therhalli is one such example.

Other temples situated on hills include Chamundeshwari Hills, Mahadeshwara Hills, Biligiriranga Hills and Kodachadri Hills.

Temples and Practices
Some temples of Dakshina Kannada have the practice of not allowing ordinary clothing to be worn inside. People can drape a cloth over, or wear a Dhoti. This practice is especially found in the temples in Dakshina Kannada, which lies between the Western Ghats and the Arabian Sea. This is a very popular temple as the climate is suitable for visits all year long. Kollur, Kukke, Dharmasthala, Sringeri, Horanadu, Karkala, Murudeshwara and Gokarna are some other famous temples known for devotees thronging to them throughout the year.

Many temples in Udupi represent the Dvaita philosophy and are mostly run by priests of the Ashta Matha monasteries. The Sri Krishna temple, also in Udupi, features the Kanakana kindi or Kanaka's Window, a small peephole in the wall of the temple through which a statue of the great Indian saint Kanaka Dasa may be viewed.

Temples in Sringeri represent the Advaita Vedanta philosophy of Adi Shankara. Being one of the oldest institutions of Sanskrit learning, Sringeri Shaarada Peetha is seen as the abode of Saraswati, the goddess of learning, and holds a very prominent place in the history of learning and in the hearts of Kannadigas.

North Karnataka temples represent the old glory of long ago kingdoms, with some rituals still practised. Many of the magnificently sculpted temples include shaasanas (inscriptions) which depict various important historical periods.

See also
 Karnataka
 North Karnataka
 Tourism in Karnataka
 Tourism in North Karnataka
 Temples of North Karnataka
 Jainism in North Karnataka
 Chettikulangara Devi Temple

History of Karnataka
Culture of Karnataka